The mottled ground gecko (Lucasium squarrosum) is a gecko endemic to Australia.

References

Lucasium
Reptiles described in 1962
Taxa named by Arnold G. Kluge
Geckos of Australia